A by-election to elect the Lord Mayor of Melbourne took place from 23 April until 11 May 2018, following the resignation of the 103rd Lord Mayor, Robert Doyle. The election used a preferential voting system and was held by postal ballot.

Background
The City of Melbourne is a local government municipality consisting of nine councillors, a lord mayor and a deputy lord mayor, who are elected for a four-year term. The incumbent lord mayor, Robert Doyle, was first elected in the 2008 City of Melbourne election.

On 15 December 2017, Cr Tessa Sullivan resigned from the council. Sullivan, who had been elected on the Team Doyle ticket alongside Doyle, lodged a complaint with the City of Melbourne chief executive Ben Rimmer. In her complaint, Sullivan alleged that Doyle had sexually harassed and indecently assaulted her. On 17 December, Doyle released a statement on Twitter, which said he had not been informed of the details of the allegations. He announced he would take a month's leave while an investigation was carried out, stressing that his standing aside "must not be interpreted as any concession or admission".

Further allegations were made against Doyle in January 2018. On 4 February 2018, Doyle resigned as Lord Mayor of Melbourne.

Candidates
The candidates for lord mayor at the by-election were:

Results

References

 2018
Lord Mayor of Melbourne 2018
Lord Mayor of Melbourne 2018
May 2018 events in Australia
April 2018 events in Australia